Lochalsh is a district of mainland Scotland, currently part of the Highland council area

Lochalsh may also refer to:

 Lochalsh, Algoma District, Ontario, a ghost town and rail siding located at the very south end of Wabatongushi Lake
 Lochalsh, Huron County, Ontario, a community in Ontario
 Loch Alsh, a sea inlet between the isle of Skye and mainland Scotland
 Kyle of Lochalsh, a village in Lochalsh, Scotland